"The Dad-Feelings Limited" is the 11th episode of the thirty-second season of the American animated television series The Simpsons, and the 695th episode overall. It aired in the United States on Fox on January 3, 2021. The episode was directed by Chris Clements, and written by Ryan Koh.

Plot 
Comic Book Guy and his wife Kumiko enjoy a lazy Sunday while Marge and Homer attend multiple children's birthday parties. Desperate for adult company, Marge and Homer leave the kids with Ned Flanders and go to Moe's for trivia night. Teaming up with Comic Book Guy and Kumiko, they win first place, and Marge and Kumiko relate over having overweight husbands. When Kumiko visits Marge, she bonds with Maggie and tells her husband she wants to have a child. Comic Book Guy, who works with children at his store every day and knows that he is an emotionally distant man, does not want to become a father.

Kumiko arranges for her husband to attend a movie with the Simpsons, and he finds he truly enjoys introducing Bart and Lisa to classic movies. When the children become upset, however, he is unable to comfort them, and returns to his family home, where his philatelist father and other obsessive relatives live alone with their collections. It is then revealed that Comic Book Guy took solace in comic books as a child solely because his father never attended any of his beloved baseball games, causing him to choke during the championship. His father later admits that he did not go to the game for fear he would not know what to say if his son lost, but produces a ball autographed by his son's hero, Sandy Koufax, that he had intended to give him. The pair play a game of catch, and Comic Book Guy returns to his wife, telling her that he is now ready to start a family.

Production

Casting 
Dan Aykroyd guest-starred in the episode as Postage Stamp Fellow, Bob Balaban appeared as the narrator, and Jenny Yokobori appeared as Kumiko.

Development 
In 2020, Fox released eight promotional pictures from the episode.

Release 
The episode originally aired on January 3, 2021, at 9:01 PM.

Reception

Viewing figures 
In the United States, the episode was watched live by 1.89 million viewers.

Critical response 
Tony Sokol with Den of Geek, said "The Simpsons goes back to the past to make way for the future on Season 32, episode 11. “The Dad Feelings-Limited” is an origin story, revealing the sad and lonely tale of Comic Book Guy. No, it isn't done in panel layouts, and his super strength turns out to be his greatest weakness." He gave the episode 4.5/5 stars.

It was selected as one of the best TV episodes of 2021 in the New York Times (2021-12-20) 

The episode was nominated for the Primetime Emmy Award for Outstanding Animated Program, but lost to the Primal episode "Plague of Madness".

References

External links
 

2021 American television episodes
The Simpsons (season 32) episodes